Robert Valentine (c. 1671 – 26 May 1747), also known as Roberto Valentini and Roberto Valentino, was an English composer, recorder player, oboist and violinist, who moved to Rome and became a naturalised Italian. He is noted for his large number of compositions for the recorder.

Biography
Born c. 1671, he was baptized in Leicester on 16 January 1674. He was the son of Thomas Follentine or Follintine, who lived in Leicester from c. 1670 and worked as a town musician there accompanied by his elder sons Thomas and Henry. The family became a prominent one in the musical life of Leicester; descendants included John Valentine, who was the grandson of Robert's eldest brother Thomas, and John Valentine's daughter Ann Valentine.

Robert Valentine seems to have spent little if any of his adult life in England before moving to Italy, where he became known by the Italian versions of his name. He settled in Rome and took a Roman wife, marrying Giulia Bellatti in September 1701 in the parish of Sant'Andrea delle Fratte. They had nine children, although only three of these survived their parents.

He died in the same Roman parish on 26 May 1747, only 12 days after the death of his wife, and not back in England at some other date, as was formerly thought.

Works
Valentine is particularly known for his large output of compositions for the recorder, as well as for his reputation as a highly skilled player of that instrument. He also played the oboe and violin. His compositions were instrumental. They include a number of collections of sonatas and trio sonatas, as well as some examples of concerto grosso. His initial style closely followed that of Arcangelo Corelli, but he gradually progressed towards the Galante style, as evidenced by his later collections of sonatas published in Northern Europe.

His works were popular in the amateur market for flute and recorder music, which flourished in England in the early 18th century, a time when the recorder was also fashionable in concert performance there. Valentine's prominence was recorded by John Hawkins in 1776 in his General History of the Science and Practice of Music:

See also
John Ravenscroft (composer), Valentine's English contemporary who also moved to Rome.

References

Sources

External links

1671 births
1747 deaths
English classical composers
Italian male classical composers
Italian Baroque composers
British recorder players
17th-century English composers
English male composers
18th-century English musicians
18th-century Italian male musicians
People from Leicester
Musicians from Rome
Musicians from Leicestershire
18th-century Italian composers
18th-century British composers
17th-century male musicians
18th-century English composers